The Museum of Philippine Political History is a museum in Malolos, Philippines. It is located on Paseo del Congreso, Plaza Rizal, Malolos City, Bulacan. The museum, owned and operated by the National Historical Commission of the Philippines (NHCP), opened to the public in 2001 to foster awareness for the country's different government systems which defined its political history, enabling an understanding of current political developments and encouraging action to safeguard republican values. The building was initially built on 1580. It was restored in 1852 and was converted into a municipal library. After the Philippine–American War, the building served as the provincial capitol Bulacan until 1930.

The museum was then located at the grounds of NHCP building on Kalaw Avenue in Rizal Park, Ermita, City of Manila. On October 12, 2016, the museum was relocated in Casa Real Shrine, Malolos City.

The museum contains relics from the First Philippine Republic, memorabilia of Gen. Emilio Aguinaldo, relics from the wealthy families of Malolos, exhibits, a printing press of the Malolos Republic, and a display of the 21 Women of Malolos memorabilia.

Literature

External links 
 National Historical Commission of the Philippines

References

History museums in the Philippines